The City of Moonee Valley is a local government area located within the metropolitan area of Melbourne, Victoria, Australia. It comprises the north-western suburbs between 3 and 13 kilometres from the Melbourne city centre, and in June 2018, the city had a population of 127,883.

History

Moonee Valley was formed in December 1994 after the merger of the City of Essendon and eastern parts of the City of Keilor.

The original council logo from 1994 was replaced in February 2010.

Exchange prefixes in the city are 937x, 837x, 933x or 833x (the latter left over from the old City of Keilor).

Features 
The Moonee Valley is a culturally diverse region with a substantial residential population and various commercial set-ups and industries. It comprises the Moonee Valley Racecourse, Essendon Airport and has several shopping precincts, restaurants, parks and offices. It is well connected and easily accessible through trams and the Craigieburn train line. It is also a thriving business centre, with close to 10,000 businesses operating in the region.

Council

Wards
The City of Moonee Valley has three wards: Buckley, Myrnong and Rose Hill.

Buckley Ward comprises Essendon Fields, Essendon North, Strathmore, Aberfeldie, most of Essendon and Strathmore Heights, and parts of Moonee Ponds and Essendon West.

Myrnong Ward comprises Ascot Vale, Flemington, Travancore, most of Moonee Ponds and part of Essendon.

Rose Hill Ward comprises Avondale Heights, Keilor East, Airport West, Niddrie, most of Essendon West and part of Strathmore Heights.

Current composition
Councillors are elected from the three multi-member wards, each electing three members, for a total of nine councillors. The current council was elected in October 2020, as its composition is:

Mayors
The current Mayor is Pierce Tyson and the Deputy Mayor is Samantha Byrne. They were elected by council in October 2022 and will serve the 2022/23 year.

Learn more about Moonee Valley 
You can learn more about our community by checking out our

 Community profile
 Economy profile
 Population forecast
 Housing analysis

Townships and localities
The 2021 census, the city had a population of 121,851 up from 116,671 in the 2016 census

^ - Territory divided with another LGA

See also
 Moonee Valley Racing Club
 List of places on the Victorian Heritage Register in the City of Moonee Valley

References

External links
 
Official website

Local government areas of Melbourne
Greater Melbourne (region)
 
1994 establishments in Australia
Populated places established in 1994